NanoHealth is a social enterprise that focuses on managing chronic diseases such as diabetes, asthma, and hypertension in Indian urban slums and low income communities. It was the 2014 recipient of the Hult Prize.

History
NanoHealth was founded in 2014 by a group of five alumni from the Indian School of Business in Hyderabad— Dr Ashish Bondia,  Manish Ranjan, Ramanathan Lakshmanan, Aditi Vaish, and Pranav Kumar Maranganty. Its primary focus is the creation of a network of local community health workers called "Saathis". These workers, who are trained and certified by the company, use the "Doc-in-a-Bag", a low-cost diagnostic tool for chronic disease management. In 2014 the company was awarded the Hult Prize, the first ever Indian team to receive the award. Two years after the founding, Pagitipati family bought over most of the non-active co-founders. Manish Ranjan continues to be the leading face of the organization and steered the company towards other business lines. Currently, NanoHealth's solution offering includes

 For Corporates: Wellness + Disease Management
 For Hospitals: https://www.NHCircle.com
 For Governments: Community Health Management

In 2018 they held an ICO to non-credentialed US investors. https://nhct.io/#nhct-tokes-buy

Partners
 Youth for Seva, an organization in India providing young volunteers to work in schools, NGOs, government hospitals and other organizations in the social sector
Tabeeb, a US-based health care firm with an international virtual network of specialist doctors

Awards
 Hult Prize
 GHMC

References

External links

Social enterprises
Medical and health organisations based in India
Organisations based in Hyderabad, India
Indian companies established in 2014
2014 establishments in Andhra Pradesh